The 1985 Fresno State Bulldogs football team represented California State University, Fresno as a member of the Pacific Coast Athletic Association (PCAA) during the 1985 NCAA Division I-A football season. Led by eighth-year head coach Jim Sweeney, Fresno State compiled an overall record of 11–0–1 with a mark of 7–0 in conference play, winning the PCAA title. The Bulldogs played their home games at Bulldog Stadium in Fresno, California.

Fresno State earned their second NCAA Division I-A postseason bowl game berth in 1985. They played the 20th ranked, Mid-American Conference (MAC) champion Bowling Green in the fifth annual California Bowl at Bulldog Stadium on December 18, winning 51–7.

Schedule

Team players in the NFL
No Fresno State Bulldogs were selected in the 1986 NFL Draft.

The following finished their college career in 1985, were not drafted, but played in the NFL.

References

Fresno State
Fresno State Bulldogs football seasons
Big West Conference football champion seasons
College football undefeated seasons
Fresno State Bulldogs football